Desert Rock was the code name of a series of exercises conducted by the US military in conjunction with atmospheric nuclear tests. They were carried out at the Nevada Proving Grounds between 1951 and 1957.

Their purpose was to train troops and gain knowledge of military maneuvers and operations on the nuclear battlefield. They included observer programs, tactical maneuvers, and damage effects tests.

The site was used to billet troops and stage equipment. The camp was discontinued as an Army installation in 1964.

Summary

Desert Rock I, II, III 
Observer programs were conducted at shots Dog, Sugar, and Uncle. Tactical maneuvers were conducted after shot Dog. Damage effects tests were conducted at shots Dog, Sugar, and Uncle to determine the effects of a nuclear detonation on military equipment and field fortifications.

Desert Rock IV 
Observer programs were conducted at shots Charlie, Dog, Fox, and George. Tactical maneuvers were conducted after shots Charlie, Dog, and George. Psychological tests were conducted at shots Charlie, Fox, and George to determine the troops' reactions to witnessing a nuclear detonation.

Desert Rock V 
Exercise Desert Rock V included troop orientation and training, a volunteer officer observer program, tactical troop maneuvers, operational helicopter tests, and damage effects evaluation.

Desert Rock VI 
Observer programs were conducted at shots Wasp, Moth, Tesla, Turk, Bee, Ess, Apple 1, and Apple 2. Tactical maneuvers were conducted after shots Bee and Apple 2. Technical studies were conducted at shots Wasp, Moth,
Tesla, Turk, Bee, Ess, Apple 1, Wasp Prime, Met, and Apple 2.

A test of an armored task force, RAZOR, was conducted at shot Apple 2 to demonstrate the capability of a reinforced tank battalion to seize an objective immediately after a nuclear detonation.

Desert Rock VII, VIII 
Tactical maneuvers were conducted after shots Hood, Smoky, and Galileo. At shot Hood, the Marine Corps conducted a maneuver involving the use of a helicopter airlift and tactical air support. At shot Smoky, Army troops conducted an airlift assault, and at shot Galileo, Army troops were tested to determine their psychological reactions to witnessing a nuclear detonation.

See also
 Totskoye nuclear exercise of 1954, a somewhat comparable series of Soviet exercises.

Research

External links

 
 
 ACHRE report Chapter 10: Human Research at the Bomb Tests The Defense Department's Medical Experts: Advocates of Troop Maneuvers and Human Experimentation

1951 in Nevada
1952 in Nevada
1953 in Nevada
1955 in Nevada
1957 in Nevada
1951 in military history
1952 in military history
1953 in military history
1955 in military history
1957 in military history
Explosions in 1951
Explosions in 1952
Explosions in 1953
Explosions in 1955
Explosions in 1957
American nuclear weapons testing
Military exercises involving the United States